X-Mas in Hell is an EP by Sixx:A.M., side project of Mötley Crüe's Nikki Sixx. It was released June 10, 2008, and was a digital download only release.

Track listing

Personnel
Nikki Sixx - bass guitar, backing vocals
DJ Ashba - lead guitar, backing vocals
James Michael - lead vocals, rhythm guitar, keyboards

References

2008 debut EPs
Sixx:A.M. albums
Eleven Seven Label Group EPs